The Rt Rev. Roy Walter Frederick Cowdry, AKC  was Suffragan Bishop of the Anglican Diocese of Cape Town and Archdeacon of Cape Town from 1958 to 1964.

Cowdry was educated at King's College London and ordained in 1942.  After curacies in Perivale and Ealing he became Domestic Chaplain to the Archbishop of Cape Town.

In 1964 he became Rector of St Cuthbert, Port Elizabeth; and in 1970 of St Phillip in the same city.

Notes

Alumni of King's College London
Associates of King's College London
20th-century Anglican Church of Southern Africa bishops
Archdeacons of The Cape
Anglican suffragan bishops in South Africa
Anglican bishops of Cape Town